William H. Cunningham (born 1944) is an American academic administrator, a university faculty member and a business executive. He served as the 24th president of the University of Texas at Austin from 1985 to 1992. He served as the seventh chancellor of the 15-campus University of Texas System from 1992 to 2000. He holds the James L. Bayless Chair for Free Enterprise at UT Austin's McCombs School of Business, and he is a director of Southwest Airlines. and other companies.

References

Living people
Presidents of the University of Texas at Austin
American corporate directors
Southwest Airlines people
1944 births
McCombs School of Business faculty
American university and college faculty deans
Business school deans